The 2010 Royal Bank Cup was the 40th Junior "A" 2010 ice hockey National Championship for the Canadian Junior Hockey League.  The 2010 Royal Bank Cup marked the 40th consecutive year a national championship has been awarded to this skill level since the breakaway of Major Junior hockey in 1970.

The Royal Bank Cup was competed for by the winners of the Doyle Cup, Anavet Cup, Dudley Hewitt Cup, the Fred Page Cup and the host city, the Dauphin Kings of the Manitoba Junior Hockey League.

The tournament was hosted by the Dauphin Kings and ran from May 1 to May 9 of 2010 with games played at the Credit Union Place in Dauphin, Manitoba.  Charlie Major will be appearing as a special guest the night before the opening game.

In the end, the defending 2009 Royal Bank Cup champion Vernon Vipers were too much for the hometown Dauphin Kings, crushing them 8-1 in the final.  In another lopsided results, during the round robin, the Brockville Braves crushed the Oakville Blades 11-2 to tie two different tournament records (goal by a winning team in one game, one game spread).

Teams
Dauphin Kings (Host)
Regular Season: 50-11-1-0 (1st Overall in MJHL)
Playoffs: Defeated Neepawa Natives 4-0, Defeated Swan Valley Stampeders 4-1, Defeated Winnipeg Saints 4-0, Defeated La Ronge Ice Wolves 4-1 for Anavet Cup.
Brockville Braves (East)
Regular Season: 52-8-0-2 (1st Overall in CJHL)
Playoffs: Defeated Kemptville 73's 4-0, Defeated Ottawa Jr. Senators 4-0, Lost to Pembroke Lumber Kings 1-4, Won Fred Page Cup (4-0).
La Ronge Ice Wolves (West)
Regular Season: 29-21-3-5 (7th Overall in SJHL)
Playoffs: Defeated Humboldt Broncos 3-0, Defeated Flin Flon Bombers 4-2, Defeated Battlefords North Stars 4-2, Defeated Yorkton Terriers 4-2, Lost to Dauphin Kings 1-4 for Anavet Cup.
Oakville Blades (Central)
Regular Season: 46-9-0-1 (2nd Overall in OJAHL)
Playoffs: Defeated Aurora Tigers 4-1, Defeated Georgetown Raiders 4-1, Defeated Kingston Voyageurs 4-3, Defeated Newmarket Hurricanes 4-2 for Buckland Cup, Won Dudley Hewitt Cup (4-0).
Vernon Vipers (Pacific)
Regular Season: 51-6-0-3 (1st Overall in BCHL)
Playoffs: Defeated Quesnel Millionaires 4-2, Defeated Penticton Vees 4-2, Defeated Powell River Kings 4-3, Defeated Spruce Grove Saints 4-3 for Doyle Cup.

Tournament

Round Robin

Results

Semi-final

Final

Awards
Roland Mercier Trophy (Tournament MVP): Shane Luke (Dauphin Kings)
Top Forward: Scott Arnold (Brockville Braves)
Top Defencemen: Dustin Stevenson (La Ronge Ice Wolves)
Top Goaltender: Justin Gilbert (Brockville Braves)
Tubby Smaltz Trophy (Sportsmanship): Kellen Jones (Vernon Vipers)

Roll of League Champions
AJHL - Spruce Grove Saints
BCHL - Vernon Vipers
CCHL - Newmarket Hurricanes
CJHL - Pembroke Lumber Kings
MJAHL - Woodstock Slammers
MJHL - Dauphin Kings
NOJHL - Abitibi Eskimos
OJAHL - Oakville Blades
QJAAAHL - Terrebonne Cobras
SIJHL - Fort William North Stars
SJHL - La Ronge Ice Wolves

See also
Canadian Junior Hockey League
Royal Bank Cup
Anavet Cup
Doyle Cup
Dudley Hewitt Cup
Fred Page Cup

References

External links
Royal Bank Cup Website

2010
Royal Bank Cup
Royal Bank Cup
Royal Bank Cup 2010